The Xylenini are a mid-sized tribe of moths in the Hadeninae subfamily. There is some dispute about this tribe. Some resources have these genera listed under subfamily Cuculliinae instead, or upranked them to a distinct subfamily Xyleninae.

Genera 
 Agrochola Hübner, 1821
 Bombycia Stephens, 1829
 Epiglaea Grote, 1878
 Fishia Grote, 1877
 Hillia Grote, 1883
 Lithophane Hübner, 1821
 Mniotype Franclemont, 1941
 Mormo
 Platypolia Grote, 1895
 Sunira Franclemont, 1950
 Sutyna Todd, 1958
 Xanthia Ochsenheimer, 1816
 Xylena Ochsenheimer, 1816
 Xylotype Hampson, 1906

References

 
Hadeninae
Moth tribes